Lecanora subpraesistens is a species of corticolous (bark-dwelling) and crustose lichen in the family Lecanoraceae. Found in northern India, it was formally described as a new species in 2006 by Sanjeeva Nayaka, Dalip Kumar Upreti, and H. Thorsten Lumbsch. It is only known to occur at the type locality. Characteristic features of the lichen include its pulicaris-type amphithecium, glabrata-type epihymenium, and 16-spored asci. Secondary compounds in the lichen include atranorin, chloroatranorin, and zeorin. The specific epithet refers to its similarity with the species Lecanora praesistens.

See also
List of Lecanora species

References

subpraesistens
Lichen species
Lichens described in 2006
Lichens of India
Taxa named by Helge Thorsten Lumbsch
Taxa named by Dalip Kumar Upreti